The Tatar was one of the seven original Turkic tribes that made up the Kimek confederation, along with the Īmī, Īmāk, Bayāndur, Khifchāq, Nilqāz and Ajlad. The Tatār were the third in order. The Kimek tribes originated in the Central Asian steppes, and had migrated to the territory of present-day Kazakhstan. The Tatar, as part of the Kimek, were mentioned by Gardizi (d. 1061).

According to R. Fakhroutdinov, these Tatars 'were a branch of the ancient Tatar population that went to the west after the collapse of the Eastern Turkic kaganate'. Mahmud al-Kashgari noted that the Tatars are bilingual, speaking in Turkic alongside their own language. Golden proposed that Tatars were Turkified Mongolic speakers.

The Shine Usu inscription mentioned that the Toquz Tatars, in alliance with the Sekiz-Oghuz (i.e. "Eight Oghuzes", denoting the eight tribes who revolted against the leading Uyghur tribe), unsuccessfully revolted against Uyghur Khagan Bayanchur, who was consolidating power between 744 and 750 CE. After being defeated three times, half of the Oghuz & Tatar rebels rejoined the Uyghurs, while the other half fled to an unknown people, who were identified as Khitans or Karluks. According to Senga and Klyashtorny, part of the Toquz-Tatar rebels fled westwards from the Uyghurs to the Irtysh river basin, where they later organized the Kipchaks and other tribal groupings (either already there or also newly arrived) into the Kimek tribal union.

See also
Tatar confederation
Tatars

References

Sources

Kimek confederation
History of the Tatars